Anastasius of Antioch may refer to:

 Anastasius of Antioch (martyr) (died 302), Christian martyr
 Anastasius I of Antioch, called "the Sinaite", Patriarch of Antioch in 561–571 and 593–599
 Anastasius II of Antioch, Patriarch of Antioch in 599–609
 Anastasius III of Antioch, Patriarch of Antioch in 620–628